The 1947 Nevada Wolf Pack football team was an American football team that represented the University of Nevada as an independent during the 1947 college football season. The team compiled a 9–2 record, outscored opponents by a total of 321 to 154, and defeated  North Texas State Teachers, 13–6, in the 1948 Salad Bowl.

In March 1947, the university hired Joe Sheeketski as its head football coach. He had played halfback at Notre Dame in 1931 and 1932 and had been head coach at Holy Cross from 1939 to 1941. Sheeketski served as Nevada's head coach for four seasons from 1947 to 1950.

Alva Tabor played quarterback for the 1947 Nevada team. He was one of the first African-Americans to play quarterback for a major college football team.

Schedule

References

Nevada
Nevada Wolf Pack football seasons
Salad Bowl champion seasons
Nevada Wolf Pack football